The 2013 FIBA Americas Championship for Men, later known as the FIBA AmeriCup, was the qualifying tournament for FIBA Americas, for the 2014 FIBA World Cup, in Spain. This FIBA AmeriCup tournament was held in Caracas, Venezuela, from August 30, to September 11, 2013. The top four teams qualified for the 2014 FIBA World Cup.

Mexico defeated Puerto Rico, in the final, to win their first AmeriCup title.

Qualification

Central American and Caribbean Sub-Zone (2012 Centrobasket):

North American Sub-Zone:

South American Sub-Zone (South American Basketball Championship 2012):

Draw
The draw was held at the Catia Theatre in Caracas on February 28. This was how the teams were seeded:

As hosts, Venezuela picked first the group that they played at, and their final opponent in the preliminary round. Included are the last published FIBA World Rankings prior to the draw.

Format
The ten teams were split into two groups. The best four teams of each group advanced to the second round, where the teams played against the four teams from the other group; each team carried over all points earned during the first round, except for those earned in the match against the team that was eliminated. The best four teams of this group advanced to the semifinals and were qualified for the 2014 FIBA World Cup. The United States, which won the Olympic Gold Medal in 2012, automatically qualified for the 2014 FIBA World Cup and chose not to participate in the 2013 Americas Championship. Originally, Panama were supposed to compete but was replaced by Mexico after FIBA implemented a suspension on the Panamanian Basketball Federation. Mexico was chosen as the next highest placed finisher in Panama's subcategory (COCABA) at the 2012 Centrobasket tournament.

Squads

Preliminary round

Group A
In Group A, team Puerto Rico secured their first round undefeated, as well as narrowly clinching their win against surprising newcomer Jamaica 88–82, while Canada and Uruguay also secured their place for the second round. Brazil lost all four games for the first time.

|}

Group B
Hosts Venezuela lost their first two games against surprising Mexico and Argentina, but managed to win two other games to advance the second round, despite having two losses in the game. The Mexican team lost their three-win streak to the Argentine basketball team, while Paraguay's poor efforts prevented them from winning a single game since their recent game in 2010.

|}

Second round
Puerto Rico narrowly clinched their place for the 2014 FIBA Basketball World Cup against surprising hosts Venezuela in an 85–86 thriller of an overtime match. Meanwhile, upstart Mexico also clinched their position for the World Cup from their performance, while Dominican Republic and Argentina also secured their place for the World Cup. Despite the efforts, the Canadian team were unable to put up a defensive and offensive play, thus eliminating the team for the second time since 2011. Newcomers Jamaica was also eliminated, despite winning against the Argentine team, whereas Uruguay were unable to make their debut for the Championship round, losing half of the matches throughout the Second Round.

|}

Final round

Semifinals
Mexico avenged their first-round loss to world third-ranked Argentina, becoming the first team to advance to the final round. Meanwhile, Puerto Rico avenged their second-round loss against the Dominican team to secure their place in the final match against Mexico.

Third place match

Final

Awards

All-Tournament Team
 PG –  Facundo Campazzo 
 SG –  J. J. Barea 
 SF –  Renaldo Balkman 
 PF –  Luis Scola 
 C –  Gustavo Ayón (MVP)

Final ranking

Statistical leaders

Points

Rebounds

Assists

Blocks

Steals

FIBA broadcasting rights

References

External links

 
FIBA AmeriCup
2013–14 in North American basketball
2013–14 in South American basketball
2013 in Venezuelan sport
International basketball competitions hosted by Venezuela